Walter William Ouless  (21 September 1848 – 25 December 1933) was a British portrait painter from Jersey. He became an Associate of the Royal Academy (ARA) in 1877 and a full member (RA) in 1881.

Life and career
He was born in 1848 at 53 Paradise Row, New Street, Saint Helier, at the home where his father, marine artist Philip John Ouless, had established his studio in the previous year. His mother was Caroline Savage. He was educated at Victoria College and went to London in 1864, where he entered the Royal Academy schools in 1865. His earliest work was in the field of genre painting, but his compatriot Millais advised him to concentrate on portrait painting, in which field he established a successful career. In later life he turned to landscape painting.

Ouless was "one of the best-known portraitists of the latter years of the nineteenth century", regarded as an "impressive exponent of character".

He was a volunteer in the Artists Rifles. His daughter Catherine Ouless (1879–1961) also achieved success as an artist.

Exhibitions
Ouless exhibited at the Royal Academy from 1869, in the British Section of the Chicago Exhibition of 1893, and of the Paris Exhibition of 1900.

Gallery

References

Dictionary of Painters of the Channel Islands, Philip Stevens, Jersey 2002,

External links

 
Biography (London Atelier of representational Art)
W. W. Ouless online (ArtCyclopedia)
W. W. Ouless on Artnet
 Portraits of Ouless (National Portrait Gallery (London)).
 Portraits by Ouless (National Portrait Gallery (London)).
Portrait of Stephen Augustus Ralli  (1882, Christie's)
Portrait of William Henry Mason  (1879, Christie's)

19th-century British painters
British male painters
20th-century British painters
British portrait painters
Royal Academicians
1848 births
1933 deaths
People from Saint Helier
Jersey artists
Artists' Rifles soldiers
People educated at Victoria College, Jersey
19th-century British male artists
20th-century British male artists